Rosemerry Wahtola Trommer is an American poet, listed in the Colorado Poets Center directory of poets associated with that state. She has achieved several honors for her work. She served as Poet Laureate of San Miguel County, Colorado from 2006–2010, and was named Poet Laureate of Colorado's Western Slope by the Telluride Institute from 2015–2017.

Published works

 Naked for Tea (2018, Able Muse Press)   
 Even Now: Poems and Drawings (2016) (coauthor: illustrator Jill Sabella)  
 The Less I Hold (2012,  Turkey Buzzard Press)  
 The Miracle Already Happening (2011, Liquid Light Press)  
 Intimate Landscape: The Four Corners Region in Poetry & Photography (coauthor: photographer Claude Steelman) (2009, Durango Herald Small Press)
 Holding Three Things at Once (2008, Turkey Buzzard Press)  
 Insatiable (2004, Sisu Press)  
 If You Listen: Poems & Photographs of the San Juan Mountains (coauthor: photographer Eileen Benjamin) (2000, Western Reflections Press)

References

External links
 Official website

American women poets
Colorado College alumni
Living people
People from San Miguel County, Colorado
University of Wisconsin–Madison College of Letters and Science alumni
Year of birth missing (living people)
21st-century American women writers
21st-century American poets
Poets from Colorado